was a district located in Kyoto Prefecture, Japan.

As of 2005, the district had an estimated population of 5,233 and a density of 15.37 persons per km2. The total area was 340.47 km2.

Former towns and villages
 Keihoku
 Miyama

Mergers
 On April 1, 2005 - the town of Keihoku merged into the city of Kyoto (Ukyo Ward).
 On January 1, 2006 - the town of Miyama, along with the towns of Hiyoshi, Sonobe and Yagi (all from Funai District), were merged to create the city of Nantan. Kitakuwada District was dissolved as a result of this merger.

Former districts of Kyoto Prefecture